The Bankhead House, also known as Sunset and the John Hollis Bankhead House, is a historic mansion in Jasper, Walker County, Alabama.  It was added to the National Register of Historic Places on June 18, 1973.

History
The Classical Revival-style house was built for John H. Bankhead in 1910.  He served in the Alabama Legislature, as a U.S. Representative, and as a U.S. Senator. His granddaughter, the award-winning actress Tallulah Brockman Bankhead and her sister Eugenia, were raised in the house when Congress was not in session.  The pair were largely reared by their grandmother, Tallulah James Brockman Bankhead, after their mother died from sepsis less than a month after Tallulah's birth.

Architecture
The Classical Revival-style house is a two-story wood-frame building with a stone foundation and hipped roof.  It features a one-story portico that spans the full width of the front (east) of the house and partially wraps around each side.  At the front central bay, the porch projects and transitions to a two-tiered portico that frames the main entrance.  A porte cochere projects out from the main porch on the south side of the house.  Most of the windows feature one lite per sash, typical of the time the house was built.

References

External links
 

National Register of Historic Places in Walker County, Alabama
Houses in Walker County, Alabama
Neoclassical architecture in Alabama
Houses completed in 1910
Historic house museums in Alabama
Houses on the National Register of Historic Places in Alabama
Bankhead family
Historic American Buildings Survey in Alabama
1910 establishments in Alabama